Cyclargus thomasi, known generally as the Thomas's blue, Miami blue or Caribbean blue, is a species of butterfly in the family Lycaenidae. It is found in North America and the West Indies.

The subspecies C. t. bethunebakeri, which is found only in Florida, is known as the Miami blue.

The MONA or Hodges number for Cyclargus thomasi is 4358.

References

Further reading

 

Cyclargus
Articles created by Qbugbot